Blue Tongue may refer to :

 Blue-tongued skink
 Bluetongue disease
 Blue Tongue Entertainment - an Australian video game developer
 Blue Tongue bush or Straits Rhododendron, Melastoma polyanthum